Sigrid Sepp (born 2 July 1998) is an Estonian backstroke, butterfly and medley swimmer. She competed in the women's 50 metre backstroke event at the 2017 World Aquatics Championships. She is 24-time long course and 15-time short course Estonian swimming champion. She has broken 8 Estonian records in swimming.

Sepp currently attends the University of Hawaii, where she is a member of their swimming and diving team. Her sister, Kätlin Sepp, is also a swimmer.

References

External links
 
Biography at esbl.ee 

1998 births
Living people
Estonian female backstroke swimmers
Estonian female butterfly swimmers
Swimmers from Tallinn
Estonian expatriate sportspeople in the United States
Estonian female medley swimmers
Hawaii Rainbow Wahine swimmers
21st-century Estonian women